The Greek Catholic Archeparchy of Hajdúdorog is a Metropolitan archeparchy (Eastern Catholic archdiocese) of the Greek Catholic Church in Hungary.
 
Its Metropolitan archeparch is the head of the Greek Catholic Church in Hungary. The Metropolitanate is a sui iuris Eastern particular Church in full union with the Catholic Church, which uses the Byzantine Rite in Hungarian language, covering the entire area of Hungary.
 
The archepiscopal cathedral is located in the city of Hajdúdorog, whereas the seat of the metropolitanate is in Debrecen according to the founding bull.

History 
On 8 June 1912, it was established as Eparchy (Eastern Catholic diocese) of Hajdúdorog, on territory formerly belonging to the Metropolitanate sui juris of Romanian Greek Catholic Major Archeparchy of Făgăraș and Alba Iulia, Greek Catholic Metropolitan Archeparchy of Prešov, Latin Metropolitan Archdiocese of Esztergom (Hungary), Eparchies of Gherla, Armenopoli and Szamos-Ujvár, Mukachevo and Oradea Mare.

According to Austro-Hungarian authorities, a bomb sent by Ilie Cătărău exploded on 23 February 1914 at the palace of the new Eparchy of Hajdúdorog; 3 people were killed and over 20 wounded.

On 9 April 1934, the eparchy lost territory to Metropolitanate sui juris of Făgăraş and Alba Iulia and Eparchies of Maramureş and Oradea Mare (in Romania) and on 5 March 2011 lost more territory to the pre-existing, also Hungarian (Greek) Catholic Apostolic Exarchate of Miskolc.

On 20 March 2015, it was elevated to Archeparchy and Metropolitanate sui juris, with two simultaneously created suffragan Eparchies comprised in its new province: 
 the Hungarian Catholic Eparchy of Nyíregyháza, split from Hajdúdorog's former territory 
 the Hungarian Catholic Eparchy of Miskolc, promoting the former Apostolic Exarchate of Miskolc to diocesan rank.

Special churches 
 Cathedral : Istenszülő templomba vezetése Görög katolikus székesegyház, in Hajdúdorog
 Minor Basilica : Görög Katolikus Lelkészi Hivatal Kegytemplom, in Máriapócs, Szabolcs-Szatmár-Bereg

Incumbent Episcopate 
 Eparchs (Bishops) of Hajdúdorog (Byzantine Rite) 
 Antal Papp (1912 – 1913), Apostolic Administrator
 István Miklósy (23 June 1913 – 30 October 1937)
 Miklós Dudás, O.S.B.M.  (25 March 1939 – 15 July 1972)
 Imre Timkó (7 January 1975 – 30 March 1988)
 Szilárd Keresztes (30 June 1988 – 10 November 2007; previously Auxiliary Bishop and Titular Bishop of Chunavia 7 January 1975 – 30 June 1988)
 the above Szilárd Keresztes as Apostolic Administrator 10 November 2007 – 5 February 2008)
 Bishop Péter Fülöp Kocsis (5 February 2008 – 20 March 2015 - see below)

 Archeparchs (Archbishops) of Hajdúdorog (Byzantine Rite) 
 Archbishop Péter Fülöp Kocsis (see above - 20 March 2015 – present)

See also 
 Roman Catholicism in Hungary

References

Sources and external links
 GCatholic.org, with biography links from incumbent (arch)bishops
 Catholic Hierarchy
Véghseő Tamás: Our Paths. Byzantine Rite Catholics in Hungary

Eastern Catholic dioceses in Hungary
Christian organizations established in 1912
Roman Catholic dioceses and prelatures established in the 20th century
Hajdudorog
1912 establishments in Austria-Hungary
Hungarian Greek Catholic Church